Valerie Rushworth is a British road and track racing cyclist.

Biography
Rushworth's first sport was running, she was a member of the Wakefield Harriers. She started cycling with Monckton CC.

She was national road race champion in 1964 and held several records on the track including motor-paced records set in 1964: quarter-mile flying start in 23.5 seconds, half-mile flying start in 46.0 seconds and the mile flying start in 1 minute 34.0 seconds.

She won 11 British Championships between 1959 and 1966, and went on to represent Great Britain internationally, as a rider and later as coach and team manager.

In 1970 she moved to Featherstone RC.

She coached Lisa Brambani, who became a national road race champion four consecutive years between 1986 and 1989.

Rushworth was the European masters champion in the 500m TT for women aged 50 plus for four consecutive years between 1997 and 2000.

She joined Bob Jackson's team in 2001.

Rushworth, who lives in Allerton Bywater, Yorkshire near Wakefield, is coaching advisor for the Women's Cycle Racing Association. She works as a Customer Services Manager for Waddingtons Games.

Palmarès

1964
1st  British National Road Race Championships

1973
3rd Sprint, British National Track Championships

1997
1st  500m TT, European Masters Track Championships (50+)

1998
1st  500m TT, European Masters Track Championships (50+)

1999
1st  500m TT, European Masters Track Championships (50+)

2000
1st  500m TT, European Masters Track Championships (50+)

2004
3rd 500m TT, European Masters Track Championships (50+)

References

External links
 Val Rushworth at cyclingarchives.com

Year of birth missing (living people)
Living people
English female cyclists
British cycling road race champions
British cycling coaches
People from the City of Wakefield
Cyclists from Yorkshire